Lee Gwang-yeong (born 9 September 1946) is a South Korean figure skater. He competed in the men's singles event at the 1968 Winter Olympics.

References

1946 births
Living people
South Korean male single skaters
Olympic figure skaters of South Korea
Figure skaters at the 1968 Winter Olympics
Figure skaters from Seoul